Mukhaizna Airport  is an airport serving the Mukhaizna oil field in Oman. The runway has  overruns on each end.

Airlines and destinations

See also
Transport in Oman
List of airports in Oman

References

External links
OpenStreetMap - Mukhaizna Airport
OurAirports - Mukhaizna Airport
FallingRain - Mukhaizna Airport

Airports in Oman